Voșlăbeni (also Voșlobeni; ,) is a commune in Harghita County, Transylvania, Romania composed of two villages:

Izvoru Mureșului / Marosfő
Voșlăbeni / Vasláb

The Chindeni joins the Mureș near Voșlăbeni.

Demographics
In 2011, 1,921 people lived in the commune, of which 1,127 or 58.67% are Romanians, 771 or 40.14% are Hungarians. Of the latter, around half live in the village of Izvoru Mureșului, which has a Hungarian majority of 58.75%.

References

Communes in Harghita County
Localities in Transylvania